Bizone is the combination of the American and the British occupation zones during the occupation of Germany after World War II.

Bizone may also refer to:

 Bizone, synonym for Cyana, a genus of moths
 Bizone, or Byzone, an ancient Greek colony in modern-day Kavarna, Bulgaria
 Bizone Rock, a rock in the South Shetland Islands, Antarctica

See also 
 Bizon (disambiguation)
 Bison (disambiguation)
 Bisone, a frazione of the Italian commune of Cisano Bergamasco